Rolf Zurbrügg (born 1971) is a Swiss ski mountaineer and national ski-mountaineering coach. He is also a cross-country skier and a trained mountain guide.

Zurbrügg was born in Adelboden. Professionally he is deployed in the Border Guard Corps and works at the border station of Brig. By order of the Swiss Alpine Club he has coached the national ski mountaineering team since November 2005.

Selected results 
Zurbrügg won several Swiss Cup races.

 2002: 1st, Patrouille de la Maya A-course, together with Damien Farquet and Rico Elmer
 2003: 1st, Trofeo Mezzalama, together with Damien Farquet and Rico Elmer
 2004: 2nd, Zermatt-Rothorn run

Patrouille des Glaciers 

 2000: 5th (international military teams ranking), together with Pvt E-2 Ernest Farquet and Pvt E-2 Gregoire Saillen
 2004: 3rd, together with Damien Farquet and Rico Elmer

External links

References 

1971 births
Living people
Swiss male ski mountaineers
Swiss male cross-country skiers
Swiss military patrol (sport) runners
Swiss sports coaches
Ski mountaineering coaches